Kennington is a London Underground station on Kennington Park Road in Kennington within the London Borough of Southwark. The station is at the junction of the Charing Cross and Bank branches of the Northern line to the north and the Morden and Battersea Power Station branches to the south. Its neighbouring stations to the north are Waterloo on the Charing Cross branch and Elephant & Castle on the Bank branch; the next stations to the south are Oval and Nine Elms. The station is in both Travelcard Zones 1 and 2.

The station was opened in 1890 as part of the world's first underground electric railway and its surface building remains largely unaltered. In the 1920s, the underground parts of the station were reconstructed so that the line could be extended and larger trains could be used. Two additional platforms and later several cross passages were provided for interchanges between the branches.

History

City and South London Railway
In 1884, the City of London and Southwark Subway (CL&SS) was granted parliamentary approval to construct an underground railway from King William Street in the City of London to Elephant & Castle in Southwark. Unlike previous underground railways in London that had been constructed using the cut and cover method, the CL&SS was to be constructed in a pair of deep-level tunnels bored using tunnelling shields with circular segmental cast-iron tunnel linings. James Henry Greathead was the engineer for the railway and had used the tunnelling method on the Tower Subway bored under the River Thames in 1869.

Construction work began in 1886, and in 1887 the railway was granted additional approval for an extension to Kennington, Oval and Stockwell. The CL&SS was originally designed to be operated using a cabled-hauled system of trains, but the haulage method was changed in January 1899 to use electric locomotives, making it the world's first underground electric railway. The CL&SS changed its name to the City and South London Railway (C&SLR) early in 1890.

The platforms at Kennington and most of the other intermediate stations were constructed at different levels, with one side wall of the upper platform tunnel supported on the side wall of the lower platform tunnel. Travel between the surface and the platforms was by hydraulic lift or spiral stairs with the lower lift landing being at a level between the two platforms with steps or ramps up and down to the platforms.

The station building is a single-storey structure topped by a dome which originally housed the hydraulic equipment for the lifts. It was designed by T. P. Figgis and occupies the northern corner of the junction of Kennington Park Road and Braganza Street (previously New Street).  Before opening, the C&SLR considered naming the station New Street. The station was opened on 18 December 1890 along with the rest of the line.

Reconstruction and connection to Hampstead Tube
The small diameter of the running tunnels meant that the train carriages were cramped compared to the deep-level tube railways that were constructed with larger diameter tunnels. In 1913, the C&SLR obtained permission to enlarge the tunnels to enable it to use new modern rolling stock, but World War I delayed the works. After the war, the C&SLR obtained renewed permission for the enlargement works. These were undertaken as part of a programme of works including an extension of the Hampstead Tube from Embankment to Kennington.

The UERL planned to enlarge most of the C&SLR's tunnels whilst the railway remained in operation, with enlargement taking place at night and trains running during the day. Special tunnelling shields were constructed with openings that trains could run through. To facilitate the enlargement works, Kennington station was closed on 1 June 1923 and used as a depot for the construction works. The platforms were removed and sidings installed for spoil wagons. A new shaft was sunk from the garden of an adjacent house to provide access to the tunnels and the passenger lifts were used to transfer the wagons between the tunnels and the surface.

To achieve a convenient arrangement for the interchange between the existing tunnels and the new ones to Embankment, several changes were made to the organisation of the station below ground. Two new platform tunnels were constructed parallel with and at the same level as the corresponding existing tunnels with the new tunnels on the outside of the existing ones. Linking passages were constructed between each pair of platforms to enable cross-platform interchanges. Both of the existing platforms had been accessed from the east, so, to make the link to the new northbound tunnel, the platform in the existing northbound tunnel was reconstructed on the other side, and the tracks were repositioned. 

The existing passage between the platforms and the lifts was severed by the new southbound platform so each pair of platforms was connected to new entrance and exit passages leading to and from the lifts. The enlargement was done with standard segmental iron linings, rather than the original brick.

At the lower levels of the station, the platform walls and passages were decorated with a new tiling scheme by Charles Holden, matching that used on new stations on the Morden extension and the new stations from Embankment. Other C&SLR stations were rebuilt during the 1920s modernisation (including the replacement of lifts with escalators at some), but the surface building at Kennington station was left largely unaltered. It is therefore the only station of the C&SLR's original section still in a condition close to its original design and the only one to be a listed building.

To enable trains from Waterloo to reverse, a loop tunnel was constructed connecting the new southbound and northbound platforms. A siding constructed between the two existing tunnels provided a reversing facility for trains coming from Elephant & Castle. Because the original southbound running tunnel was lower than the original northbound tunnel, a section of the siding was constructed at a 1:40 gradient to bring trains up to the level of the northbound tunnel before the reversing siding, which can accommodate two trains.

Following the completion of the extension and reconstruction works, the C&SLR and the Hampstead Tube operated as a single line, although they retained their own identities into the 1930s. A variety of names were used before "Northern line" was adopted in 1937.

Post-war plans

After World War II, a review of rail transport in the London area produced a report in 1946 that proposed many new lines and identified the Morden branch as being the most overcrowded section of the London Underground, needing additional capacity. To relieve the congestion, the report recommended construction of a second pair of tunnels beneath the Northern line's tunnels between Kennington and Tooting Broadway to provide an express service. Charing Cross branch trains would use the express tunnels and run to Morden. Trains using the existing tunnels would start and end at Tooting Broadway. Designated as routes 10, this proposal was not developed by the London Passenger Transport Board or its successor organisations.

Refurbishment
Refurbishment work at Kennington was completed in 2005. This included replacement of the 1920s tiles on platform and passage walls with matching tiles. Travel between surface and platform level continues to be via passenger lifts or stairs.

Extension to Battersea Power Station

In 2014, Transport for London (TfL) was granted parliamentary approval to construct an extension of the Charing Cross branch from Kennington to Battersea Power Station via Nine Elms. The new extension tunnels connect to the reversing loop tunnel in step plate junctions constructed from temporary construction shafts in Radcot Street and Harmsworth Street. Two chambers were constructed on the line of the new tunnels at Kennington Green and Kennington Park for ventilation and emergency access. 

TfL assessed that the Battersea extension will not significantly impact the number of passengers entering and exiting the station, but, to accommodate additional interchanges between the branches, additional cross-platform passageways were constructed between each pair of platforms. The -long extension opened on 20 September 2021.

Services and connections

The station is in Travelcard zones 1 and 2, between Nine Elms and Waterloo or Oval and Elephant & Castle stations. Train frequencies vary throughout the day but generally operate every 3–6 minutes between 05:37 and 00:33 northbound to Edgware, High Barnet or Mill Hill East via the Charing Cross or Bank branches and every 2–5 minutes between 06:01 and 00:46 southbound. For most of the day, Charing Cross Branch trains generally run to or from Battersea Power station, or start or terminate at Kennington, using the Kennington loop, while Bank Branch trains all run to or from Morden. During Peak hours, there are some limited Charing Cross Branch trains that also run to or from Morden. During Night Tube operations, all Charing Cross Branch trains run to Morden, while the Bank and Battersea Branches lack night tube services.

London Bus routes 133, 155, 333 and 415 with night routes N133 and N155 serve the station.

Notes and references

Notes

References

Bibliography

External links

London Transport Museum Photographic Archive

Northern line stations
Tube stations in the London Borough of Southwark
Former City and South London Railway stations
Railway stations in Great Britain opened in 1890
Domes
Tube station
London Underground Night Tube stations